This is a list of all auto racing tracks in the United States. The track length stands for the standard, full courses for each track. The major series listed are only series that currently hold a race at the track.

Dragstrip

Dirt ovals

Figure 8 courses

Paved ovals

Superspeedways 
This list contains all known paved oval tracks larger than or equal .

Intermediate ovals 

Speedways

1 Mile ovals

Paved short tracks

3/4 – 7/8 mi

5/8 mi

1/2 mi

2/5 mi

3/8 mi

1/3 mi

1/4 mi or shorter

Permanent road and temporary street circuits

By city

Defunct tracks

Dragstrips

Road courses

Paved ovals

Temporary circuits

See also

List of motor racing venues by capacity
List of U.S. stadiums by capacity
List of NASCAR tracks
List of NASCAR series
List of Champ Car circuits
List of IndyCar Series racetracks 
IndyCar Series
NASCAR
NHRA
Drag Racing
ChampCar Endurance Series

References

 
United States
Auto racing